Crick may refer to:

Places 
 Crick, Monmouthshire, Wales
 Crick, Northamptonshire, England
 Crick Road, Oxford, England

People with the name
 Crick (surname)

Other uses
 Crick, the cricket from Beat Bugs
 Francis Crick Institute, London, England, known as The Crick
 Watson and Crick, a reference to "Molecular Structure of Nucleic Acids: A Structure for Deoxyribose Nucleic Acid", a seminal article published by Francis Crick and James D. Watson in the scientific journal Nature [25 April 1953]

See also 
 Creek (disambiguation)